Jaime Mela (born 17 November 1890, date of death unknown) was a Spanish fencer. He competed in the team sabre event at the 1924 Summer Olympics.

References

External links
 

1890 births
Year of death missing
Spanish male sabre fencers
Olympic fencers of Spain
Fencers at the 1924 Summer Olympics
Sportspeople from Barcelona